The Sonya class, Soviet designation Project 1265 Yakhont, are a group of minesweepers built for the Soviet Navy and Soviet allies between 1971 and 1991.

Design
 
A central safe explosion proof area is fitted and all key systems can be remote controlled from there.

Operators

A total of 72 ships were built by Uliis yard in the Vladivostok and Avangard yards in Petrozavodsk between 1971 and 1991. One ship, BT-730, was lost in an accident in 1985.

 19 ships (2023).
 Baltic Fleet – 4 ships
 Northern Fleet – 5 ships
 Pacific Fleet – 7 ships
 Caspian Flotilla – 3 ships

 2 ships in service.
 U330 Melitopol
 U331 Mariupol

 2 ships in service.

 4 ships transferred.

 4 ships transferred.

 1 ship transferred.

 4 ships transferred.

See also
 List of ships of the Soviet Navy
 List of ships of Russia by project number

References

  Also published as 
 

Mine warfare vessel classes
Minesweepers of the Soviet Navy
 
Minesweepers of the Azerbaijani Navy
 
Minesweepers of the Bulgarian Navy
Minesweepers of the Cuban Navy
Minesweepers of the Russian Navy
 
Minesweepers of the Syrian Navy
Minesweepers of the Ukrainian Navy
 
Minesweepers of the Vietnam People's Navy